Sathyaprathinja is a 1992 Malayalam film directed by Suresh Unnithan. Murali, Suresh Gopi, Jagathi Sreekumar and Geetha did the major roles in the film. The movie was produced by A. K. K. Bappu under the banner of Arakkal Films which was distributed by Arakkal Films as well. The movie was scripted by S. L. Puram Sadanandan.

Plot
A state's chief minister faces various anti-social forces and fights them courageously. However, he encounters a sinister politician who tries to belittle the former's efforts.

Cast
Murali as Achuthan
Suresh Gopi as Sreedharan
 Urvashi as Sreekutty
 Vijayaraghavan as Gopan
Jagathi Sreekumar
Geetha
Kundara Johny
 Adoor Bhavani as Sreedharan's Mother
Sukumari as Achuthan's Mother
Saikumar

References

External links 
 
 Sathyaprathinja – Malayalasangeetham.info

1990s Malayalam-language films
1992 films
Films scored by Mohan Sithara